Corkwood is a common name of a number of plants:

 Ackama paniculosa, a soft barked corkwood from Australia in the coachwood family
 Annona glabra, found in the West Indies
 Commiphora angolensis (sand corkwood), a shrub mainly in Angola and Namibia
 Commiphora saxicola (rock corkwood), a shrub endemic to Namibia
 Duboisia, a genus with species in Australia
 Endiandra sieberi, a corkwood from Australia in the laurel family
 Entelea arborescens, found in New Zealand
 Erythrina vespertilio (grey corkwood), Australia
 Hakea divaricata, found in Australia
 Hakea ivoryi, Australia
 Hakea suberea, Australia
 Leitneria floridana, southeastern North America
 Melicope, a genus with species in Australia
 Musanga cecropioides (African corkwood), Africa
 Sesbania grandiflora, southeast Asia and northern Australia, with edible flowers
Stillingia aquatica, woody shrub that grows in the southeastern United States